Yusmery del Valle Ascanio Nieves (born 20 December 1990) is a Venezuelan footballer who plays as a midfielder for Chilean Championship club Colo-Colo and the Venezuela women's national team.

Club career
Ascanio has played the Copa Libertadores with Caracas FC.

References

External links

1990 births
Living people
Women's association football midfielders
Women's association football defenders
Venezuelan women's footballers
People from Guárico
Colo-Colo (women) footballers
Venezuela women's international footballers
Venezuelan expatriate women's footballers
Venezuelan expatriate sportspeople in Chile
Expatriate women's footballers in Chile